is a junction passenger railway station located in the city of Tokushima in Tokushima Prefecture, Japan, operated by the Shikoku Railway Company (JR Shikoku).

Lines
It is also served by direct trains to and from the Tokushima Line and Naruto Line.

Layout
The station consists of one island platform and one side platform with a notch to enable it to service two tracks. The station building is an 18-story structure with a multi-storey car park. The exit is only on the south side where the bus terminal is located, and facing the downtown area . The station has a Midori no Madoguchi staffed ticket office.

History
The station opened on 16 February 1899. With the privatization of Japanese National Railways (JNR), the successor of JGR, on 1 April 1987, the station came under the control of JR Shikoku.

Passenger statistics
In fiscal 2019, the station was used by an average of 8089 passengers daily

Surrounding area
The station is located in the center of downtown Tokushima.

See also
 List of railway stations in Japan

References

External links

  

Railway stations in Japan opened in 1899
Railway stations in Tokushima Prefecture
Stations of Shikoku Railway Company
Tokushima (city)